This is a list of surviving Cessna T-37 Tweets.

Survivors
Pakistan

Display of T-37B Tweet 

The airplane monument is put up in memory of Pilot Officer Raja Jahanzeb Shaheed who deliberately abstained from ejecting and steered his malfunctioning T-37 away from crashing into the studentdense faculties of GIKI University.

Norway
Display
T-37B Tweet
57-2247 - Norsk Luftartsmuseum (Norwegian Aviation Museum), Bodo AB (north-East side), Bodo, Nordland.

South Korea
Display
T-37C Tweet
73-1687 - Boramae Park Seoul, South Korea. The aircraft is painted in the colors of the ROKAF Black Eagles aerobatic team, although they operated the A-37B Dragonfly  from 1994 to 2007 and are not known to have operated the T-37C.

United States

Airworthy
T-37C Tweet
66-13618 - privately owned in Delafield, Wisconsin.
66-13620 - privately owned in Dallas, Texas.
Display
XT-37 Tweet
54-0718 - Mid-America Air Museum in Liberal, Kansas.
T-37B Tweet
54-2730 - Randolph Air Force Base in San Antonio, Texas.
54-2732 - MAPS Air Museum in Canton, Ohio.
54-2733 - Cherokee County Veterans Museum in Gaffney, South Carolina.
54-2734 - Dyess Linear Air Park at Dyess Air Force Base in Abilene, Texas.
54-2736 - Grissom Air Museum at Grissom Air Reserve Base in Peru, Indiana.
54-2739 - Laughlin Air Force Base in Del Rio, Texas.
55-4305 - Hangar 25 Air Museum at Big Spring McMahon-Wrinkle Airport (former Webb Air Force Base) in Big Spring, Texas.
56-3466 - US Army Aviation Museum, Fort Rucker, Ozark, Alabama.
56-3546 - Bartow Airport (former Bartow Air Base), Bartow, Florida.
56-3555 - Southern Museum of Flight in Birmingham, Alabama.
56-3563 - Jet, Oklahoma, adjacent to Kegelman Air Force Auxiliary Field, a training base for nearby Vance Air Force Base in Enid, Oklahoma.
57-2259 - Hill Aerospace Museum at Hill Air Force Base in Ogden, Utah.
57-2261 - Fort Worth Aviation Museum, Fort Worth, Texas.
57-2267 - Pima Air & Space Museum, adjacent to Davis-Monthan Air Force Base in Tucson, Arizona.
57-2289 - National Museum of the United States Air Force at Wright-Patterson Air Force Base in Dayton, Ohio.
57-2305 - Olympic Flight Museum in Olympia, Washington.
57-2316 - March Field Air Museum at March Air Reserve Base in Riverside, California.
57-2322 - Estrella Warbirds Museum in Paso Robles, California.
58-1914 - Columbus Air Force Base in Columbus, Mississippi.
58-1962 - Yanks Air Museum in Chino, California (awaiting restoration).
58-1977 - Kansas Aviation Museum in Wichita, Kansas
59-0274 - Columbus, Mississippi.
58-0289 - Yanks Air Museum in Chino, California (awaiting restoration).
59-0361 - Perrin Air Force Base Museum at North Texas Regional Airport (former Perrin Air Force Base) in Denison, Texas.
59-0383 - Commemorative Air Force Highland Lakes Squadron Air Museum (Hill County Squadron) in Burnet, Texas.
60-0100 - Museum of Aviation at Robins Air Force Base in Warner Robins, Georgia.
68-8050 - Vance Air Force Base, Enid, Oklahoma.
T-37C Tweet
62-5950 - Sheppard Air Force Base in Wichita Falls, Texas.
62-5952 - Historic Aviation Memorial Museum in Tyler, Texas.

Turkey
Display
T-37B Tweet
2-39839 - Eskişehir Büyükşehir Belediyesi Sazova Bilim Kültür Sanat Parkı

References

Cessna T-37 Tweets